Samlaya Junction railway station is a railway station on the Western Railway network in the state of Gujarat, India. Samlaya Junction railway station is 26 km from Vadodara railway station. Passenger, MEMU, Express and Superfast trains halt at Samlaya Junction railway station.

Nearby stations 

Alindra Road is the nearest railway station towards Vadodara, whereas Lotana is the nearest railway station towards Dahod.

Trains 

The following Express/Superfast trains halt at Samlaya Junction railway station in both directions:

 12929/30 Valsad - Dahod Intercity Superfast Express
 19023/24 Mumbai Central - Firozpur Janata Express
 19019/20 Mumbai Central - Dehradun Express

References

See also
 Vadodara district

Railway stations in Vadodara district
Vadodara railway division
Railway junction stations in Gujarat